Chitta Lahu (Punjabi: ਚਿੱਟਾ ਲਹੂ) is a Punjabi novel written by Punjabi novelist Nanak Singh. It was first published in 1932. The novel was translated into Russian by Leo Tolstoy's grand daughter Natasha Tolstoy. In his novel Chitta Lahu (White Blood), Singh writes, "It seems to imply that in the lifeblood of our society, red corpuscles have disappeared." In 2011, Nanak Singh's grandson, Dilraj Singh Suri, translated Chitta Lahu into English (titled White Blood).

References

Punjabi-language novels